General elections were held in Mauritius on 26 and 27 August 1953. The result was a victory for the Labour Party, which won 13 of the 19 elected seats on the Legislative Council. The twelve nominated members were appointed on 11 September. As had happened following the 1948 elections, the Governor-General Hilary Blood appointed twelve conservatives, largely to ensure the dominance of English and French speakers.

Results

By constituency

References

Elections in Mauritius
1953 in Mauritius
Mauritius
Election and referendum articles with incomplete results